Zirconium propionate is a white powder with molecular formula Zr(CH3CH2COO)4. Its structure is complex, but is believed to be based on hydroxy-bridged zirconium polymers, with the propionate carboxyl group bonded to the zirconium. It is not soluble in water, but dissolves in isopropanol, ethanol and ethyl acetate. When tamped or untamped, it has a density of 1.14 g/cm3 or 0.98 g/cm3 respectively. It is used to promote adhesion in solvent-based inks.

References

Propionates
Zirconium compounds